"Band Candy" is the sixth episode of season three of the television show Buffy the Vampire Slayer. It was written by Jane Espenson, directed by Michael Lange, and first broadcast on November 10, 1998.

Plot
Principal Snyder hands out boxes of candy to all the students, which they must sell to pay for new marching band uniforms. Buffy sells half of her chocolate bars to her mom, and the other half  to Giles. She then visits Angel, who is practicing T'ai chi. When she arrives home, Buffy finds her mother and Giles eating the band candy.

The next day, Giles fails to show up for study hall, where Xander and Willow are playing footsie. Worried, Buffy goes to Giles' home and finds her mom on the couch. Joyce offhandedly gives her the car keys to drive home, to Buffy's astonishment. Giles, now acting like he did as a teen, invites Joyce out for some fun.

Buffy and Willow find The Bronze packed with adults who are acting like teenagers, including Principal Snyder. They return to Giles' place to find out what is going on.

At the warehouse, the vampire Mr. Trick checks up on Ethan Rayne and the production of the chocolate bars. Trick suddenly accuses one of the workers of eating the candy, and kills him as an example to the others.

Buffy eventually puts two and two together and realizes that the candy is making everyone act like immature teenagers. She sends Willow and Oz to the library and drives to the warehouse. Upon arrival, Buffy finds her mother and Giles kissing in the middle of the street. Inside the warehouse, Buffy catches Ethan; her threat of violence persuades him to reveal that Trick needs to dull Sunnydale adults in order to collect a tribute for a demon named Lurconis. Meanwhile, four vampires enter the hospital to remove four newborn babies. Willow phones Buffy from the library and tells her that Lurconis eats babies. Giles remembers that the demon may be found in the sewers.

Down in the sewers, the Mayor and Mr. Trick wait impatiently while the four vampires chant in a ceremony to summon Lurconis. Buffy, Giles and Joyce crash the party, and the Mayor quickly flees unnoticed. Buffy fights the vampires while Giles and Joyce take the babies to safety. The huge snake-like demon appears and swallows one of the vampires whole. Giles attacks Trick, but is thrown into the path of Lurconis. Buffy pulls down a gas pipe, igniting a fire that kills the demon.

Back at his office, the Mayor asks why Trick fled, allowing Buffy to kill Lurconis. Trick replies that he thought he did the Mayor a favor by having the Slayer kill the demon, leaving one less demon to whom the Mayor would owe tribute. The Mayor warns Trick against doing him any more such favors.

The next day, the adults have returned to their senses. Buffy and Giles meet Joyce, and Buffy exclaims that they are lucky she stopped them before they did more than they did. Joyce and Giles look very embarrassed, but Buffy fails to notice.

Reception 
Noel Murray of The A.V. Club writes that the episode "shows an alternate version of Sunnydale that's grounded in the town's own dark reality. Or as Oz says, 'Sobering mirror to look into, huh?

References

External links

 

Buffy the Vampire Slayer (season 3) episodes
1998 American television episodes
Television episodes written by Jane Espenson